Hybrid models of forest production, sometimes abbreviated to hybrid models, combine growth and yield modelling with physiological modelling.

See also
 FORECAST
 Law of Maximum

References

External links
 A free model to register existing models from the IEFC.
 Forest growth models list

Forest modelling